10 Ka Dum (English: Power of 10) is an Indian version of the international reality game show Power of 10, and aired on Sony Entertainment Television. The show was hosted by popular Bollywood actor Salman Khan. According to reports, the show helped Sony TV regain its third position in the Indian television ratings. A third season was announced in early 2018, which premiered on 4 June 2018, on the same network. The grand finale guest of the third season were Shahrukh Khan and Rani Mukherjee. The final episode also had a special entry of actor-comedian Sunil Grover in his characters of "Rinku Bhabhi" and "Amitabh Bachchan".

Game rules
The game consists of two rounds.

First round
In the first round, two contestants compete against each other in a best three-out-of-five format in which they are asked a 'Poll Question' and asked to provide a whole percentage number that most closely approximates the exact survey poll answer for the question. The contestant whose answers are closest to the poll results for 3 out of 5 national survey questions wins the 'First-Round'. The contestant who loses is then eliminated from the game.

Second round
The contestant who wins the first round plays the game to win up to Rs. 100,000,000/- by trying to correctly approximate the survey's results within a narrowing percentage range for up to four poll questions. In this round, the contestant was given similar questions and placed a range on a scale from 0% to 100% that included the correct answer. (For example, if the answer was 53%, then the contestant's range must have included 53%.) The size of the range decreased as the money values increased:
 Rs. 10,000 question: 40% range
 Rs. 100,000 question: 30% range
 Rs. 1,000,000 question: 20% range
 Rs. 10,000,000 question: 10% range (answer won't be shown even if one answers correctly)
 Rs. 100,000,000 question: One has to pick a number ( the question is the same one for 100,000,000 (question 4), but the contestant has to pick the number from the range you have selected in previous correct answer)

For the first three poll questions, the correct answer to the question was revealed once the contestant locked-in an answer by pulling down a lever. For the fourth question of Rs. 1,00,00,000, the correct answer was revealed only if the contestant's range missed the question. And if the question was answered correctly, the contestant was then given the chance to win Rs.100,000,000 by picking the exact percentage (rounded to the nearest 1%) out of that 10% range (11 choices in all). In addition, the contestant has the opportunity to consult with his or her designated supporter before deciding whether to lock in a response at the Rs.100,000,000 prize level.

As with the lower prize levels, the contestant may elect to take the walk-away prize for the Rs. 100,000,000 (ten crore rupees) prize level, i.e., Rs. 1,000,000 and terminate the game before locking in a response. However, if the contestant decides to lock in a response, the response cannot be changed, and the contestant no longer has the option of taking the walk-away prize of Rs. 10,000,000. If the contestant locks in a response, the survey result for the poll question is then revealed. If the survey's result is exactly the same as the contestant's response, the contestant is then awarded Rs. 100,000,000. But, if the survey's result is not exactly the same as the contestant's response, the contestant will be awarded Rs. 1,000,000.

Prize-level (in Rupees)
 Note: All prizes listed below include any taxes that may apply.

Season 1
 

Note:

 Kailash Kher didn't win any money because he was on the show to promote Indian Idol 4.
 Rani Mukherji actually won Rs.100,000 but Sony Television decided to give her Rs.1,000,000.

Aamir Khan

Aamir Khan appeared on 4 July episode. The 1 Crore question he was asked was: What percentage of Indian men think they are more intelligent than women? He dialed in a range between 51% and 61%. The correct answer was in the range, thus he won 1 Crore. He quit the show and didn't gamble for 10 Crore, but dialed in a guess of 57%. The exact percentage to the question was indeed 57%, so he would've won the jackpot of 10 Crore had he played on.

Season 2

Season 3

Ratings
The show was popular and was at number one thousand spot in ratings in India. It garnered an average TVR of 2.81 and a peak rating of 4.5, leaving behind Shahrukh Khan's Kya Aap Paanchvi Paas Se Tej hai? with an average rating of 1.37 TVR and a peak rating of 2.3 and Hrithik Roshan's Junoon — Kuch Kar Dikhane Ka on NDTV Imagine with an average TVR of 0.76 and a peak rating of 1.1

Awards and nominations
Indian Telly Awards 2008 and 2009
 Salman Khan won the Best Anchor Award for 10 Ka Dum in 2008 and 2009.
 10 Ka Dum won Best Game Show Award in 2008 and 2010.

References

External links
 10 Ka Dum Official Site on Sony TV
 10 Ka Dum at Sify.com 
 Synergy Adlabs website 
 Dus Ka Dum on Internet Movie Database  
 

Sony Entertainment Television original programming
Indian game shows
2008 Indian television series debuts
Television series by Sony Pictures Television
2010s Indian television series
Indian television series based on American television series